Barfani Dham (Patal Bhairvi) is a temple in the town of Rajnandgaon in the Indian state of Chhattisgarh. A large Shiva Linga can be seen at the top of the temple while a large Nandi statue stands in front of it.

Structure
The temple is constructed in three levels. The bottom layer is the shrine of Pathal bhairavi, the second is the Navadurga or Tripura Sundari shrine and the upper level is of Shiva.

Gallery

References

External links
 pathal bhairavi temple

Rajnandgaon
Shiva temples in Chhattisgarh